Jubilee is the fourth live album American contemporary worship music collective Maverick City Music. It was initially released on February 24, 2021, via Tribl Records, as an exclusive to Tribl App customers. The album was made available to other streaming platforms on February 26, 2021. The featured worship leaders on the album are Naomi Raine, Bryan & Katie Torwalt, Maryanne J. George, Chandler Moore, Nicole Binion, Ryan Ofei, Joe L Barnes, Nate Moore, and Dante Bowe. The EP was produced by Jonathan Jay and Tony Brown.

Jubilee debuted at No. 14 on Billboard's Top Christian Albums Chart and No. 2 on Top Gospel Albums Chart.

Background
Naomi Raine of Maverick City Music shared in an interview with Worship Musician Magazine that Jubilee is a collection of songs dedicated to Spirituals, which were the origins and start of Gospel music. Raine also shared the vision behind the album, saying:

Release and promotion
On February 22, 2021, Maverick City Music released the music video for "Jubilee" featuring Naomi Raine and Bryan & Katie Torwalt on YouTube. Maverick City Music also announced that Jubilee will be released on Tribl App exclusively on February 24, 2021, with the release to other streaming platforms being slated for February 26, 2021. On February 23, 2021, Maverick City Music released the music video for "Ruins" featuring Joe L Barnes and Nate Moore on YouTube. On February 24, 2021, Maverick City Music released the music video for "God of Israel" featuring Naomi Raine and Maryanne J. George on YouTube, with Jubilee being availed for streaming on Tribl App. On February 26, 2021, Maverick City Music released Jubilee to other streaming platforms, and published the music video for "The Blood Is Still the Blood" featuring Chandler Moore, Nicole Binion and Ryan Ofei, on YouTube.

Commercial performance
In the United States, Jubilee debuted at No. 14 on Top Christian Albums and No. 2 on Top Gospel Albums charts dated March 13, 2021, having earned 2,000 equivalent album units in its first week of sales.

Track listing

 "Hymn Medley" is a medley of the hymns "Great Is Thy Faithfulness," "'Tis So Sweet to Trust in Jesus," and "It Is Well."

Charts

Weekly charts

Year-end charts

Release history

References

External links
  on MultiTracks

2021 albums
Maverick City Music albums